Supernormal is a children's television programme for CITV.  It was developed and produced by World Leaders Entertainment in New York City, USA, and Granada Kids UK. It was animated by Fatkat Animation, a Canadian animation studio. It made its television début on 1 September 2007 on CITV, but the official premiere was on 8 September of the same year.

About the show

In the ordinary city of Crumptonville can be found a school for superheroes!
Sure, the students wear Spandex and study Death Traps and Doomsday Machines, but they still have all the problems normal kids have at normal schools. There are super-achievers and super-slackers, super-nerds and super-jocks… there's even a teacher's pet - but it lives in the basement, and eats cats!
SuperNormal follows the adventures of four of the, er, less promising students at the school.
There’s Changerella - a peace-loving shape-shifter who thinks the world would be happier with more flowers, love and pink stuff.
The Brass Butt (BB to his friends) - he's not too bright, but is super strong and uses his mighty and shiny brass butt to fight the forces of evil!
Buzz Girl - a sarcastic four-armed girl who possesses a multitude of powers from the insect world... and a weakness for porch lights!
And Eric Normal. An ordinary boy with no superpowers whatsoever. Yet through a combination of sheer good luck and a little dash of common sense, he was able to get through the school’s combination obstacle course/entrance exam.
It's here that brave, enthusiastic and earnest Eric Normal and his friends will learn what it really means to be heroes, with or without superpowers!

Characters

Eric Normal
Eric Normal, the world's first superhero without superpowers!

Eric Normal may wear a Spandex suit and a home made cape, but the only thing super about him is his total normalcy. Feisty and determined, Eric is living every kid's dream: he gets to dress up in a colourful costume and punch things, but he takes his role as a superhero-in-training very seriously. He's filled with enthusiasm, a keen sense of justice and is itching to give evil a swift kick in the butt. Eric knows that he doesn't have any superpowers, but that won't stop him from getting stuck in! He fancies himself as a master planner, but his plans are rarely thought out. But whether it's luck or coincidence, Eric Normal will always stand victorious. When the fate of the world teeters on the brink of oblivion, a 13-year old kid with the power of being super normal may not be the first person you think of ringing, but Eric always has his hand on the phone, ready to answer the call of justice! He is voiced by Michael Sinterniklaas.

The Brass Butt (BB)
Strong and loyal! The Brass Butt is Eric Normal's best friend and constant companion. BB (as he's known to his friends) comes from a long line of Brass Butts. His father was a Brass Butt. His father's father was a Brass Butt. His father's father's father was a just a tin butt, but that guy's dad was a Brass Butt too! He is voiced by Gary Littman.

Changerella
Changerella is an incredibly optimistic and peaceful and loving person, with the power of shape-shifting. Similar to BB she has very low intelligence such as being forgetful or not paying any attention. The most empathetic of the group, she is caring and very protective of the rest. She usually claps and cheers at Eric's ideas even when she knows it's obvious they won't work. She wears purple and pink clothes, decorated with flowers. She is voiced by Sarah Hadland.

Buzz Girl
Buzz Girl has all the powers of an insect, that is, she can climb walls, fly and stretch her tongue.  She can also spin webs, a trait that belongs to arachnids, not insects.  She speaks with sarcastic comments and snide remarks, but means well. Buzz Girl rarely smiles in most of the episodes and frowns or sulks more often.  She has four arms and wings, and wears a black and purple bathing suit. She is voiced by Tara Sands.

Critical response
On a poll run by CITV, only 2% of children voted it their favourite television programme on the channel, tied sixth with Pocoyo.  First in the poll was Horrid Henry, followed by Bratz, My Parents Are Aliens, Jungle Run and Emu.  Tied for last place with 1% were Skyland and Jim Jam and Sunny.

References

British children's animated superhero television series